The 1990 Ibero-American Championships in Athletics (Spanish: IV Campeonato Iberoamericano de Atletismo) was the fourth edition of the international athletics competition between Ibero-American nations which was held at the Vila Olímpica in Manaus, Brazil from 14–16 September. Forty event finals were held and six championships records were set in Manaus.

The competition was beset with organisational problems and schedule clashes. Cuba, which had previously sent large delegations, was absent. Temperatures were extremely high -  - during the three-day competition and consequently the plans for the marathon races, scheduled for the final day, were abandoned. The 1990 Central American and Caribbean Games was held in Mexico two months later and preparation for this larger meet meant other athletes chose not to compete at the Ibero-American Championships. As a result, many of the events were principally contested between the top Brazilian and Spanish athletes, who won 31 of the 40 gold medals available between them. Brazil won the most event, with 17 golds and 37 in total, while Spain had the most medals overall with 43 (14 of them gold). Portugal were a distant third with two gold medals and twelve medals altogether.

Robson da Silva retained his 100 and 200 metres titles and won a third gold for Brazil in the relay. Antonio Peñalver (an Olympic medallist two years later) won the first decathlon to be held at the championships, while Orlane dos Santos won the inaugural women's heptathlon competition.

Medal summary

Men

Women

Medal table

Participation
Of the twenty-two members of the Asociación Iberoamericana de Atletismo, fourteen were present at the fourth edition – a record low for the championships. A total 205 athletes competed.  214 participating athletes (including a couple of guest athletes) were counted by analysing the official result list.

 (20)
 (1)
 (66)
 (9)
 (8)
 (7)
 (8)
 (1)
 (3)
 (8)
 (20)
 (56)
 (5)
 (2)

References

Results
El Atletismo Ibero-Americano - San Fernando 2010. RFEA. Retrieved on 2011-11-17.

Ibero-American Championships in Athletics
Ibero-American
Ibero-American
International sports competitions in Manaus
International athletics competitions hosted by Brazil
September 1990 sports events in South America